My Dateless Diary is a collection of autobiographical essays by R. K. Narayan published in 1960. The book was the output of a daily journal that he maintained during his visit to the United States on a Rockefeller Fellowship in 1956. While on this visit, Narayan also completed The Guide, the writing of which is covered in this book. The book is focused on Narayan's interactions with the American people and the people themselves. The book also highlights Narayan's view of the west, his appreciation and admiration in general, but subtle disapproval of specific aspects while making it known that there isn't much of a gap between his values and those he has come across. The book offers insights into both, the author and his subjects.

References

Books by R. K. Narayan
1960 non-fiction books
Indian Thought Publications books
Indian essay collections